Aathma Warusha is a 2015 Sri Lankan Sinhala drama thriller film directed by Kusum Chandra Gamage and produced by Mohomed Saleem for Niko Films. It stars Lal Weerasinghe and Anusha Damayanthi in lead roles along with Cletus Mendis and Robin Fernando. Music composed by Asela Indralal. The film was released 10 years after its shooting. It is the 1234th Sri Lankan film in the Sinhala cinema.

Plot

Cast
 Lal Weerasinghe as Wije
 Anusha Damayanthi
 Robin Fernando
 Cletus Mendis
 Vishaka Siriwardana
 Miyuri Samarasinghe
 Chandi Rasika
 Sureni Senarath
 Sarath Silva
 Sarath Dikkumbura
 Mark Samson

References

External links
 
 කාටවත් අත නොපා ජීවත්වන්න මං උත්සාහ කරනවා

2015 films
2010s Sinhala-language films
2015 thriller drama films
Sri Lankan thriller drama films
2015 drama films